Sheldon Moldoff (April 14, 1920 – February 29, 2012) was an American comics artist best known for his early work on the DC Comics characters Hawkman and Hawkgirl, and as one of Bob Kane's primary "ghost artists" (uncredited collaborators) on the superhero Batman. He co-created the Batman supervillains Poison Ivy, Mr. Freeze, the second Clayface, and Bat-Mite, as well as the original heroes Bat-Girl, Batwoman, and Ace the Bat-Hound. Moldoff is the sole creator of the Black Pirate. Moldoff is not to be confused with fellow Golden Age comics professional Sheldon Mayer.

Biography

Early life and career
Born in Manhattan, New York City but mostly raised in The Bronx, he was introduced to cartooning by future comics artist Bernard Baily, who lived in the same apartment house as Moldoff. "I was drawing in chalk on the sidewalk—Popeye and Betty Boop and other popular cartoons of the day—and he came by and looked at it and said, 'Hey, do you want to learn how to draw cartoons?' I said, 'Yes!' He said, 'Come on, I'll show you how to draw.'" He was of Jewish background.

Moldoff sold his first cartoon drawing at age 17. "My first work in comic books was doing filler pages for Vincent Sullivan, who was the editor at National Periodicals", one of the three companies, with Detective Comics Inc. and All-American Publications, that eventually merged to form the modern-day DC Comics. Moldoff's debut was a sports filler that appeared on the inside back cover of the landmark Action Comics #1 (June 1938), the comic book that introduced Superman.

Golden Age

During the late-1930s and 1940s Golden Age of comic books, Moldoff became a prolific cover artist for the future DC Comics. His work includes the first cover of the Golden Age Green Lantern, on issue #16 (July 1940) of All-American's flagship title All-American Comics, featuring the debut of that character created by artist Martin Nodell. Moldoff created the character Black Pirate (Jon Valor) in Action Comics #23 (April 1940),
and became one of the earliest artists for the character Hawkman (created by Gardner Fox and Dennis Neville, though sometimes misattributed to Moldoff). Moldoff drew the first image of the formerly civilian character Shiera Sanders in costume as Hawkgirl in All Star Comics #5, based on Neville's Hawkman costume design.

Beginning with Flash Comics #4 (April 1940), Moldoff became the regular Hawkman artist, following Neville's departure from the feature the issue before. He drew the Hawkman portions of the Justice Society of America stories published in All Star Comics as well. Moldoff recalled in 2000 that All-American publisher Max Gaines

Drafted into World War II military service in 1944, Moldoff returned to civilian life in 1946, drawing for Standard, Fawcett, Marvel and Max Gaines' EC Comics. For EC he drew Moon Girl, continuing with that character for Bill Gaines.

When superhero comics went out of fashion in the postwar era, Moldoff became an early pioneer in horror comics, packaging two such ready-to-prints titles in 1948. He recalled in 2000 that, "I had shown This Magazine Is Haunted and Tales of the Supernatural to [Fawcett Comics'] Will Lieberson before I showed them to [EC Comics'] Bill Gaines, because I trusted Will Lieberson much more. He showed it to the big guys at Fawcett, and he said, 'Shelly, Fawcett doesn't want to get into horror now; they don't want to touch that'".

Moldoff then did approach Gaines with the package, signing a contract stipulating that he would be paid a royalty percentage if the books were successful. Several months later, when EC's Tales From the Crypt hit the newsstands, Gaines reneged on the deal, Moldoff recalled in 2000, with EC attorney Dave Alterbaum threatening to blacklist Moldoff if he took legal action. Afterward, said Moldoff, "Will Lieberson said, 'Let me bring it back to Fawcett again, and see if they'll take the title'. And so they did; they took This Magazine Is Haunted and Worlds of Fear and then Strange Suspense Stories. What they did was pay me $100 for the title, and give me as much work as I wanted, and I also did the covers. So that went on that way".

Moldoff, who received no royalty there, either, created the cadaverous host Doctor Death.

1950s and 1960s
In 1953, Moldoff became one of the primary Batman ghost artists who, along with Win Mortimer and Dick Sprang, drew stories credited to Bob Kane, following Kane's style and under Kane's supervision. While Sprang ghosted as a DC employee, Moldoff, in a 1994 interview given while Kane was alive, described his own secret arrangement:

Moldoff and various writers created several new characters for the Batman franchise including the Batmen of All Nations, Ace the Bat-Hound, the original Batwoman, the Calendar Man, Mr. Freeze, Bat-Mite, the original Bat-Girl, and the second Clayface. Most of these characters were phased out in 1964 after a change in editors. Gardner Fox and Moldoff revived the Riddler in Batman #171 (May 1965). Other Batman foes introduced by Moldoff include Poison Ivy and the Spellbinder.

Moldoff was let go by DC in 1967, along with many other prominent writers and artists who had made demands for health and retirement benefits. His final Batman stories were published in Batman #199 and Detective Comics #372 (both cover dated February 1968). He turned to animation, doing storyboards for such animated TV series as Courageous Cat and Minute Mouse, and wrote and drew promotional comic books given away to children at the Burger King, Big Boy, Red Lobster, and Captain D's restaurant and fast-food chains, as well as through the Atlanta Braves Major League Baseball team. When Moldoff illustrated a chapter of the Evan Dorkin project Superman and Batman: World's Funnest in 2000, it was his first work for DC Comics in over 30 years.

Later life
Moldoff retired to Florida with his wife Shirley. His family included sons Richard Moldoff and Kenneth Moldoff and daughter Ellen Moldoff Stein. He died at age 91 on February 29, 2012, following kidney failure. He was the last surviving contributor of Action Comics #1.

Awards
Sheldon Moldoff received an Inkpot Award in 1991.

Bibliography

DC Comics

 Action Comics #1–2, 5–8, 10, 12, 15–17, 20–36, 38–42 (1938–1941)
 Adventure Comics #313, 320–322, 334–337, 339, 341–342, 346 (Legion of Super-Heroes) (inker) (1963–1966) 
 All-American Comics #27 (Green Lantern); #49 (Sargon the Sorcerer) (1941–1943) 
 All-Flash #6 (1942)
 All Star Comics #1–23 (1940–1944)
 Batman #81–92, 94–175, 177–181, 183–184, 186, 188–192, 194–196, 199 (1954–1968)
 Blackhawk #110–112, 119, 121–122, 127, 133–135, 139–147, 149, 151–161, 163–164, 168–169, 171–173, 181, 184 (inker) (1957–1963)
 The Brave and the Bold #54 (Kid Flash/Aqualad/Robin) (inker) (1964) 
 Comic Cavalcade #1–3, 7, 14 (1942–1946)
 Detective Comics #199–207, 213–215, 218–219, 221, 223, 225, 227–228, 230–231, 233–239, 241–242, 244–247, 249–263, 266–295, 297–298, 300–310, 312–317, 319–326, 328, 330, 332, 334, 336, 338, 340, 343, 344, 346, 348, 350, 353, 354–356, 358, 360, 362, 364–365, 368, 370, 372 (1953–1968)
 Flash Comics #1–61 (1940–1945)
 Gang Busters #29, 53, 55, 58, 61, 65–66 (1952–1958) 
 House of Mystery #2, 16, 34, 60–62, 66–67, 80, 84, 139 (1952–1963) 
 House of Secrets #5–6, 15, 18, 21 (1957–1959) 
 Mr. District Attorney #18, 35, 49, 60–66 (1950–1958)
 My Greatest Adventure #16, 68 (1957–1962)
 Mystery in Space #99 (1965) 
 Sea Devils #16–35 (inker) (1964–1967) 
 Sensation Comics  #1–31 (Black Pirate); #34 (Sargon the Sorcerer) (1942–1944) 
 Strange Adventures #187, 197 (inker) (1966–1967) 
 Superboy #118, 121, 146, 148 (inker) (1965–1968) 
 Superman #145, 147–148, 188 (inker) (1961–1966)  
 Superman and Batman: World's Funnest #1 (among other artists) (2001) 
 Superman's Girl Friend, Lois Lane #57 (inker) (1965)
 Superman's Pal Jimmy Olsen #50, 85, 87–88 (inker) (1961–1965) 
 Tales of the Unexpected #4–7, 10, 14, 16, 24, 48, 68, 84 (1956–1964) 
 Wonder Woman #1–6 (1942–1943) 
 World's Finest Comics #68, 104, 106–108, 110–113, 115, 118, 122–123, 125–127, 129, 132, 135, 139–140, 148–151, 157 (inker) (1954–1966)

EC Comics
 Animal Fables #7 (1947)
 Crime Patrol #7 (1948)
 Gunfighter #5–6 (1948)
 The Happy Houlihans #1 (1947)
 International Comics #1–5 (1947)
 International Crime Patrol #6 (1948)
 Moon Girl #2–6 (1947–1949)
 Moon Girl and the Prince #1 (1947)
 Moon Girl Fights Crime #7–8 (1949)
 War Against Crime! #4 (1948)

Fawcett Comics
 Marvel Family #25 (1948)

Marvel Comics
 Astonishing #33 (1954) 
 Combat Casey #12 (1953) 
 Journey into Unknown Worlds #17 (1953) 
 Menace #10 (1954) 
 Mystic #18, 29 (1953–1954) 
 Strange Tales #20 (1953) 
 Uncanny Tales #23 (1954)

Quality Comics
 Hit Comics #25-30 (Kid Eternity) (1942–1943)

References

Further reading
Sheldon Moldoff interview, Alter Ego #59, June 2006, pp. 14–23; previously unpublished interview conducted in 1994 for Comics Interview magazine.
 Schoellkopf, Andrea. "Convention Indulges Comic Book Addicts," Albuquerque Journal (January 16, 1995), p. A1 — profile of Moldoff

External links

 Sheldon "Shelly" Moldoff (official site). WebCitation archive
 
 
 Sheldon Moldoff at Mike's Amazing World of Comics

1920 births
2012 deaths
20th-century American artists
American animators
American comics artists
American military personnel of World War II
American storyboard artists
Artists from New York City
DC Comics people
Deaths from kidney failure
EC Comics
Golden Age comics creators
Inkpot Award winners
Silver Age comics creators